Võhmetu is a village in Tapa Parish, Lääne-Viru County, in northeastern Estonia. The population during the 2011 census was 100% native Estonian.

Villages in Lääne-Viru County